Alexis Ajinça (born May 6, 1988) is a French former professional basketball player who played 9 seasons in the National Basketball Association.

Professional career

Early years (2006–2008) 
After attending France's INSEP, Ajinça played for Pau-Orthez and Hyères-Toulon between 2006 and 2008.

Charlotte Bobcats (2008–2010) 
Ajinça was selected with the 20th overall pick in the 2008 NBA draft by the Charlotte Bobcats. During his rookie season, he spent time with the Sioux Falls Skyforce of the NBA Development League. During his second season with Charlotte, he spent time with the Maine Red Claws.

Dallas Mavericks (2010–2011) 
On July 13, 2010, Ajinça was traded, along with Tyson Chandler, to the Dallas Mavericks in exchange for Erick Dampier, Eduardo Nájera, Matt Carroll.

Toronto Raptors (2011) 
On January 24, 2011, Ajinça was traded, along with a future second-round draft pick and cash considerations, to the Toronto Raptors in exchange for the draft rights to Georgios Printezis.

Return to France (2011–2013) 
On November 2, 2011, Ajinça joined Paris-Levallois for a one-week tryout. He left the team on November 8 and joined Hyères-Toulon two days later. He appeared in just two games with Hyères-Toulon before parting ways with the team.

After failing to make a return to the NBA following the conclusion of the NBA lockout, Ajinça returned to France and signed with SIG Strasbourg on December 29, 2011. On August 13, 2012, he re-signed with Strasbourg for the 2012–13 season. On August 6, 2013, he re-signed with Strasbourg for the 2013–14 season. On December 18, 2013, he left Strasbourg to return to the NBA.

New Orleans Pelicans (2013–2018) 
On December 20, 2013, Ajinça signed with the New Orleans Pelicans. On July 9, 2015, he re-signed with the Pelicans. On April 8, 2016, he recorded career highs with 28 points and 15 rebounds in a 110–102 win over the Los Angeles Lakers.

On December 7, 2017, after missing all of the 2017–18 season up to that point, Ajinça was ruled out for the rest of the season after undergoing surgery on his right patellar tendon, an injury that typically takes four to six months to recover.

On October 15, 2018, Ajinça was traded to the Los Angeles Clippers in exchange for Wesley Johnson. He was waived by the Clippers immediately upon being acquired.

ASVEL (2018–2019) 
On December 28, 2018, Ajinça returned to France and signed with ASVEL Basket.

National team career
In September 2013, Ajinça represented the French national team at EuroBasket 2013 in Slovenia. He averaged 9.1 points and 7.0 rebounds per game.

Career statistics

NBA

Regular season

|-
| align="left" | 
| align="left" | Charlotte
| 31 || 4 || 5.9 || .362 || .000 || .714 || 1.0 || .1 || .2 || .2 || 2.3
|-
| align="left" | 
| align="left" | Charlotte
| 6 || 0 || 5.0 || .500 || .000 || .000 || .7 || .0 || .2  || .2 || 1.7
|-
| align="left" | 
| align="left" | Dallas
| 10 || 2 || 7.5 || .375 || .429 || .667 || 1.7 || .2 || .3 || .5 || 2.9
|-
| align="left" | 
| align="left" | Toronto
| 24 || 0 || 11.0 || .465 || .333 || .733 || 2.5 || .3 || .3 || .6 || 4.8
|-
| align="left" | 
| align="left" | New Orleans
| 56 || 30 || 17.0 || .544 || .000 || .836 || 4.9 || .7 || .4 || .8 || 5.9
|-
| align="left" | 
| align="left" | New Orleans
| 68 || 8 || 14.1 || .550 || .000 || .818 || 4.6 || .7 || .3 || .8 || 6.5
|-
| align="left" | 
| align="left" | New Orleans
| 59 || 17 || 14.6 || .476 || .000 || .839 || 4.6 || .5 || .3 || .6 || 6.0
|-
| align="left" | 
| align="left" | New Orleans
| 39 || 15 || 15.0 || .500 || .000 || .725 || 4.5 || .3 || .5 || .6 || 5.3
|- 
| style="text-align:center;" colspan="2"| Career
| 293 || 76 || 13.3 || .503 || .286 || .797 || 3.9 || .5 || .3 || .6 || 5.3

Playoffs

|-
| align="left" | 2015
| align="left" | New Orleans
| 3 || 0 || 3.3 || 1.000 || .000 || .000 || .3 || .3 || .3 || .0 || 2.7
|- 
| style="text-align:center;" colspan="2"| Career
| 3 || 0 || 3.3 || 1.000 || .000 || .000 || .3 || .3 || .3 || .0 || 2.7

EuroLeague

|-
| align="left" | 2006–07
| align="left" | Pau-Orthez
| 2 || 0 || 4.2 || .000 || .000 || .000 || 1.5 || .0 || .0 || .0 || .0 || -3.0
|-
| align="left" | 2013–14
| align="left" | SIG Strasbourg
| 9 || 9 || 25.5 || .553 || .000 || .757 || 5.4 || 1.7 || .9 || .9 || 17.1 || 17.2
|- 
| style="text-align:center;" colspan="2"| Career
| 11 || 9 || 21.6 || .534 || .000 || .757 || 4.7 || 1.4 || .7 || .7 || 14.0 || 13.5

Personal life
Ajinça and his wife Courtney have two sons, Carter and Caysen.

See also
 List of European basketball players in the United States

References

External links

 
 Alexis Ajinça at euroleague.net
 Alexis Ajinça at lnb.fr 

1988 births
Living people
Black French sportspeople
Centers (basketball)
Charlotte Bobcats draft picks
Charlotte Bobcats players
Dallas Mavericks players
Élan Béarnais players
French expatriate basketball people in Canada
French expatriate basketball people in the United States
French men's basketball players
HTV Basket players
Maine Red Claws players
National Basketball Association players from France
New Orleans Pelicans players
SIG Basket players
Sioux Falls Skyforce players
Sportspeople from Saint-Étienne
Toronto Raptors players